The Financial Services Act 2013, is a Malaysian laws which enacted to provide for the regulation and supervision of financial institutions, payment systems and other relevant entities and the oversight of the money market and foreign exchange market to promote financial stability and for related, consequential or incidental matters.

Structure
The Financial Services Act 2013, in its current form (22 March 2013), consists of 18 Parts containing 281 sections and 16 schedules (including no amendment).
Part I: Preliminary
Part II: Regulatory Objectives and Powers and Functions of Bank
Part III: Authorization and Registration
Part IV: Payment Systems
Part V: Prudential Requirements
Part VI: Ownership, Control and Transfer of Business
Part VII: Financial Groups
Part VIII: Business Conduct and Consumer Protection
Part IX: Money Market and Foreign Exchange Market
Part X: Submission of Document or Information 
Part XI: Examination
Part XII: Directions of Compliance
Part XIII: Intervention and Remedial Action
Part XIV: Other Powers of Bank
Part XV: Enforcement and Penalties
Part XVI: General Provisions
Part XVIII: Repeal, Savings and Transitional
Schedules

References

External links
 Financial Services Act 2013 

2013 in Malaysian law
Malaysian federal legislation